James O. "Jerry" Huntsman (November 29, 1929 – April 5, 2005) was an American football player and coach.  He served as the head football coach at Earlham College (1961–1964), and Indiana State University (1966–1972), compiling a career college football record of 72–27–1.

Playing career
Huntsman played football as a quarterback at Wabash College from 1948 through 1951, where he was selected ‘All-State’ in his senior season. He was also awarded with the Robert E. Vaughan Award as the college's outstanding athlete following his senior year.
During his U.S. Army stint; Huntsman was named to the 'All-Army' Track & Field team as a javelin thrower.

Coaching career
Huntsman began his coaching career as an assistant football coach in 1954 at Waveland High School Waveland, Indiana and then moved on to Covington High School, Covington, Indiana, leading the Trojans for the 1955 season.  He served as the head basketball coach at Waveland High, leading the Hornets to a 20–4 record and the Montgomery County Tournament title.  From 1956–58, he was the head coach for the Crawfordsville High Artesians Crawfordsville, Indiana. building a record of 14–12–2; his next stop was at Huntington High School Huntington, Indiana; his Vikings didn't lose a game during his 2 seasons; tallying a mark of 19–0–1.

Following the 1960 school year, he moved to Earlham College and spent four highly successful seasons as the head coaching job.  In 1965, he accepted an assistant coaching position at rapidly growing Indiana State University with the understanding that he would be named the head coach for the 1966 season.

College career
Huntsman's Quakers lost one game during his four-year tenure; racking up a record of 29–3 and building a national reputation for defense; in 1961, his Quakers defense was ranked 3rd in the nation.  He left his hometown of Richmond, Indiana (home of Earlham College) with a career coaching record of 62–15–3.

In 1965, he arrived in Terre Haute as an offensive assistant (backs) and joined a staff, one season removed from an Indiana Collegiate Conference championship.  His 1968 team, went 9-1, narrowly missing an invitation to the Grantland Rice Bowl.  He retired from coaching in 1973, prematurely due to poor health; he accepted a position in the athletic department; he ranked 2nd in wins (43) and 1st in winning percentage (.632) at Indiana State; he is currently 3rd in wins but maintains his position as the winningest coach in 100+ seasons of Sycamore football.  He also holds a 5–2 record in homecoming games.

He retired as the Associate Athletics Director in 1982; assisting the promotion of the Indiana State athletic department from Division II to Division I and helping secure admission to the Missouri Valley Conference.

Family
Huntsman is the son of former Earlham College and Wabash College head coach Owen Huntsman; himself a highly successful football coach.  Huntsman's brother, Stan Huntsman, was a very successful track and field coach at Ohio University, University of Tennessee, and University of Texas at Austin.

Head coaching record

References

1929 births
2005 deaths
Earlham Quakers football coaches
Indiana State Sycamores athletic directors
Indiana State Sycamores football coaches
Wabash Little Giants football players
High school football coaches in Indiana
People from Westmoreland County, Pennsylvania
Coaches of American football from Pennsylvania
Players of American football from Pennsylvania